Gold is the third compilation album, by hip-hop duo Eric B. & Rakim. The album was released on June 14, 2005, on Hip-O Records and Universal Music Group.

Background
The album contains remixes and extended mixes of Eric B. & Rakim's greatest hits as part of Universal Music Group’s Gold series.

Track listing

References

Eric B. & Rakim albums
Eric B. and Rakim
Albums produced by Eric B.
2005 greatest hits albums
Hip-O Records albums
Universal Records albums